The sixth and final season of the reality television series Love & Hip Hop: Hollywood aired on VH1 from August 5, 2019 until December 23, 2019. It was primarily filmed in Los Angeles, California. It is executively produced by Mona Scott-Young and Stephanie Gayle for Monami Entertainment, Dan Cesareo, Lucilla D'Agostino, Donna Edge Rachell, Oji Singletary and Thomas Jaeger for Big Fish Entertainment, and Nina L. Diaz and Vivian Gomez for VH1.

The series chronicles the lives of several women and men in the Los Angeles area, involved in hip hop music. It consists of 21 episodes, including a three-part reunion special hosted by Nina Parker.

Production
On October 23, 2018, VH1 announced that they had taken Eastern TV off the series, inviting "new producers to come and pitch for (the show) as it looks to take (it) in a new direction". Season six of Love & Hip Hop: Hollywood began filming in March 2019, with Big Fish Entertainment taking over as the show's production company. 

On July 8, 2019, VH1 announced Love & Hip Hop: Hollywood would be returning for a sixth season on August 5, 2019, along with a teaser confirming the return of Apryl Jones and Lil' Fizz to the main cast. New cast members would include Yo-Yo, rapper Micky Munday, J-Boog, Brittany B. and Akon's wife Tricia Ana. Brooke Valentine would leave the series after deciding to take a break after the birth of her child, while Moniece Slaughter would return as a supporting cast member, with Moniece announcing on social media that the season would be her last. Teairra Marí and Nikki Mudarris would also return late into the season in supporting roles.

On July 23, 2019, VH1 released an extended teaser. On July 17, 2019, VH1 began releasing "meet the cast" interview promos with cast members Apryl, Princess, Zellswag, Moniece, A1, Lyrica and Ray J. On July 29, 2019, VH1 released a 5 minute super-trailer.

Reception
The season would be the first of the franchise without its trademark cinematic aesthetic and high budget production values, instead resembling Big Fish Entertainment's other VH1 productions, such as Black Ink Crew. The season's premiere episode did not feature an opening credits sequence and the green screen confessional scenes were completely revamped, with cast members speaking in front of a blue backdrop and occasionally sharing confessionals together. Reactions to the show's visual changes were mixed to negative, with former main cast member Hazel-E tweeting "It went from #Hollywood to the hood". The season had the lowest-rated premiere episode in the show's history, dipping under 2 million viewers for the first time. Subsequent episodes would have the opening credits reinstated, while green screen scenes would return to their original look.

Cast

Starring
 K. Michelle (12 episodes)
 Apryl Jones (19 episodes)
 Lil' Fizz (19 episodes)
 Yo-Yo  (12 episodes)
 Lyrica Anderson (19 episodes)
 A1 Bentley (17 episodes)
 Princess Love (14 episodes)
 Ray J (17 episodes)
Note:

Credited onscreen as "Kimberly".

Also starring
 J-Boog (13 episodes)
 Jason Lee (14 episodes)
 Brittany B. (16 episodes)
 Moniece Slaughter (12 episodes)
 Apple Watts (15 episodes)
 Misster Ray (15 episodes)
 Zell Swag (19 episodes)
 Paris Phillips (18 episodes)
 Micky Munday (17 episodes)
 Daniel "Booby" Gibson (14 episodes)
 Tricia Ana (5 episodes)
 Lyrica Garrett (10 episodes)
 Pam Bentley (8 episodes)
 Teairra Marí (10 episodes)
 Nikki Mudarris (3 episodes)

Shanda Denyce, Willie Taylor and Nia Riley return in guest roles. The show also features minor appearances from notable figures within the hip hop industry and Hollywood's social scene, including Love & Hip Hop: Miamis Spectacular, Lil' Ronnie, Blac Chyna, Kimberly's surrogate Tonai, Kurupt, Summer Bunni, Lyrica's friend Sia Amun, Love & Hip Hop: Atlantas Yung Joc and Karlie Redd, T-Pain, Akon, Slick Woods, Willie Norwood, Marques Houston, Romeo and LDB of IMx, Dalvin Degrate, Kristian Bush, Black Ink Crew: Chicagos Ryan Henry, Melyssa Ford, Big Mike, Asian Doll, Claude Kelly and Chuck Harmony of Louis York and Jess Hilarious.

Episodes
<onlyinclude>{{Episode table |background=#524AA9 |overall= |season= |title=40 |airdate=30 |viewers=30 |country=U.S. |episodes=
{{Episode list/sublist|Love & Hip Hop: Hollywood (season 6)
 |EpisodeNumber   = 77
 |EpisodeNumber2  = 1
 |Title           = Hot Girl Summer
 |OriginalAirDate = 
 |ShortSummary    = B2K jump back into the spotlight as their "Millennium Tour" kicks off and B2K baby mamas Apryl and Moniece go at it. Lyrica and A1's troubled marriage is rocked when the blogs find tea on A1. Ray J and Princess try to spice things up after the birth of their baby girl, Melody.

guest stars: Spectacular (entrepreneur & musician), Booby, Lil' Ronnie (music producer), DJ Damage, Blac Chyna (entrepreneur), Tonai (Kimberly's surrogate), Keyontay (Tonai's boyfriend), Lyrica Garrett

<small>J-Boog and Brittany B join the supporting cast. Summer Bunni appears only in Instagram footage.</small>
 |Viewers         = 1.74
 |LineColor       = 524AA9
}}

 

 
 
 
 
 
 
 
 
}}</onlyinclude>

Webisodes
Check YourselfLove & Hip Hop Hollywood: Check Yourself'', which features the cast's reactions to each episode, was released weekly with every episode on digital platforms.

Bonus scenes
Deleted scenes from the season's episodes were released weekly as bonus content on VH1's official website.

Music
Several cast members had their music featured on the show and released singles to coincide with the airing of the episodes.

References

External links

2019 American television seasons
Love & Hip Hop